Arthur J. "Art, Junie" Tallackson, Jr (June 12, 1933 – September 23, 2012) was an American curler.

At the national level, he was a 1970 United States men's curling champion.

At the international level, he skipped United States men's team on  where the finished on fourth place.

Teams

References

External links
 

1933 births
2012 deaths
American male curlers
American curling champions
People from Walsh County, North Dakota
Sportspeople from Grand Forks, North Dakota